Perry (also Perrys Bridge, Pont Berry) is an unincorporated community and census-designated place in Vermilion Parish, Louisiana, United States. It was first listed as a CDP in the 2020 census with a population of 1,171.

The zipcode is: 70575. Perry's Bridge sprang up sometime after 1817, when Robert Perry, originally from Kentucky, was given a contract by the St. Martin Parish Police Jury to build a bridge across the river. By 1827, Perry, who was first appointed Sheriff of Vermilion Parish, serving 1844 to 1848, owned stores on each side of the river at Perry's Bridge, maintained a tannery there, and had other landholdings. In 1844, Perry laid out the little town.

Demographics

2020 census

Note: the US Census treats Hispanic/Latino as an ethnic category. This table excludes Latinos from the racial categories and assigns them to a separate category. Hispanics/Latinos can be of any race.

Notes

Unincorporated communities in Vermilion Parish, Louisiana
Census-designated places in Vermilion Parish, Louisiana